Events in the year 1987 in Japan.

1987 was the second year of the Japanese asset price bubble: land values in Tokyo rose more than 85 percent between July 1986 and July 1987.

Incumbents
Emperor: Hirohito
Prime Minister: Yasuhiro Nakasone (L–Gunma) until November 6, Noboru Takeshita (L–Shimane)
 Chief Cabinet Secretary: Masaharu Gotōda (L–Tokushima) until November 6, Keizō Obuchi (L–Gunma)
 Chief Justice of the Supreme Court: Kōichi Yaguchi
 President of the House of Representatives: Kenzaburō Hara (L–Hyōgo)
 President of the House of Councillors: Masaaki Fujita (L–Hiroshima)
 Diet sessions: 108th (regular session opened in December 1986, to May 27), 109th (extraordinary, July 6 to September 19), 110th (extraordinary, November 6 to November 11), 111th (extraordinary, November 27 to December 12), 112th (regular, December 28 to 1988, May 25)

Governors
Aichi Prefecture: Reiji Suzuki 
Akita Prefecture: Kikuji Sasaki 
Aomori Prefecture: Masaya Kitamura 
Chiba Prefecture: Takeshi Numata 
Ehime Prefecture: Haruki Shiraishi (until 27 January); Sadayuki Iga (starting 28 January)
Fukui Prefecture: Heidayū Nakagawa (until 23 April); Yukio Kurita (starting 23 April)
Fukuoka Prefecture: Hachiji Okuda 
Fukushima Prefecture: Isao Matsudaira 
Gifu Prefecture: Yosuke Uematsu 
Gunma Prefecture: Ichiro Shimizu 
Hiroshima Prefecture: Toranosuke Takeshita 
Hokkaido: Takahiro Yokomichi 
Hyogo Prefecture: Toshitami Kaihara 
Ibaraki Prefecture: Fujio Takeuchi 
Ishikawa Prefecture: Yōichi Nakanishi 
Iwate Prefecture:   
Kagawa Prefecture: Jōichi Hirai 
Kagoshima Prefecture: Kaname Kamada 
Kanagawa Prefecture: Kazuji Nagasu 
Kochi Prefecture: Chikara Nakauchi  
Kumamoto Prefecture: Morihiro Hosokawa 
Kyoto Prefecture: Teiichi Aramaki 
Mie Prefecture: Ryōzō Tagawa 
Miyagi Prefecture: Sōichirō Yamamoto 
Miyazaki Prefecture: Suketaka Matsukata 
Nagano Prefecture: Gorō Yoshimura 
Nagasaki Prefecture: Isamu Takada 
Nara Prefecture: Shigekiyo Ueda 
Niigata Prefecture: Takeo Kimi 
Oita Prefecture: Morihiko Hiramatsu 
Okayama Prefecture: Shiro Nagano 
Okinawa Prefecture: Junji Nishime 
Osaka Prefecture: Sakae Kishi
Saga Prefecture: Kumao Katsuki 
Saitama Prefecture: Yawara Hata 
Shiga Prefecture: Minoru Inaba 
Shiname Prefecture: Seiji Tsunematsu (until 29 April); Nobuyoshi Sumita (starting 30 April)
Shizuoka Prefecture: Shigeyoshi Saitō 
Tochigi Prefecture: Fumio Watanabe
Tokushima Prefecture: Shinzo Miki 
Tokyo: Shun'ichi Suzuki 
Tottori Prefecture: Yuji Nishio 
Toyama Prefecture: Yutaka Nakaoki
Wakayama Prefecture: Shirō Kariya  
Yamagata Prefecture: Seiichirō Itagaki 
Yamaguchi Prefecture: Toru Hirai 
Yamanashi Prefecture: Kōmei Mochizuki

Events
January 27: Construction began on Kansai International Airport.
February 9: First public float of NTT.
March 17: Asahi beer starts selling Asahi Super Dry.
April 1: Japanese National Railways is privatized and becomes the seven Japan Railways Group companies.
April 4: The Ariake Coliseum in Koto Ward, Tokyo, is completed.
June 1: Asahi TV starts broadcasting the popular short factual television programme See the World by Train (世界の車窓から)
June 6: A Shojuen elderly nursing home fire in Higashimurayama, Tokyo. according to Japanese Fire and Disaster Management agency confirmed report, 17 person lost to lives.    
July 12: Metal Gear is released by Konami.
July 23: 1987 Tokyo Metropolitan area power outage, where 2.8 million household affected, which restore spent more three and half hours, according to Japanese government confirmed report.     
October 1: Nippon Gakki Company Ltd. (Japan Musical Instrument Manufacturing Corporation) is renamed to Yamaha Corporation and Konishiroku Honten is renamed to Konica (Konica Minolta).
October 12: Susumu Tonegawa wins the Nobel Prize for Physiology or Medicine.
November 6: Noboru Takeshita becomes prime minister.
December 15: Production I.G is founded by Mitsuhisa Ishikawa and Takayuki Goto.
December 17: Mega Man is released.

During 1987:
NTT began the first mobile phone service in Japan.
Shoko Asahara founded Aum Shinrikyo.
Teikyo University of Technology and Science founded in Chiba City, as predecessor of Teikyo Heisei University.

Births

January 3: Nana Yanagisawa, actress and fashion model
January 8: Saori Gotō, voice actress
January 23: Yuto Nakamura, football player
February 12: Asami Tano, Japanese voice actress
February 15: Azumi Yamamoto, voice actress
March 12: Hiroomi Tosaka , Singer 
March 15: Momoko Shibuya, actress
March 24: Yuma Asami, adult video actress
March 25: Nobunari Oda, figure skater
March 26: YUI, singer-songwriter
April 27: Anne Suzuki, actress
May 2
Miyu Uehara, gravure idol and television personality (died 2011)
Nana Kitade, singer
May 7: Asami Konno, J-pop singer
May 20: Taku Takeuchi, ski jumper
May 22
Takuya Eguchi, voice actor
Tao Okamoto, model
June 3: Masami Nagasawa, actress
June 17: Nozomi Tsuji, performer
June 19: Miho Fukuhara, singer
June 25: Takahiro Itō, actor and voice actor (died 2009)
July 3: Mikie Hara, gravure idol and actress
July 11
Shigeaki Kato, singer
Shun Yamaguchi, professional baseball player
July 17: Mio Nishimaki, wrestler
July 27: Kozue Akimoto, model
July 28: Sumire, model (died 2009)
August 11: Kazuki Sorimachi, football player
August 16: Eri Kitamura, voice actress and singer
August 24: Daichi Miura, singer and dancer
September 11: Kaori Matsumoto, judoka
September 21: Elly, Dancer and Rapper
September 28: Sho Uchida, freestyle swimmer
October 1: Hiroki Aiba, actor, dancer, and singer
October 3: Asami Kitagawa, swimmer
October 4: Atomu Tanaka, football player
October 8: Aya Hirano, voice actress and singer
October 15: Mizuho Sakaguchi, footballer
October 23: Miyuu Sawai, model, actress, and idol
October 23: Naomi Watanabe, actress and comedian
October 27: Thelma Aoyama, J-Pop and R&B singer
October 29: Makoto Ogawa, pop singer
November 11: Yuya Tegoshi, singer
November 12: Kengo Kora, actor
November 27: Yuria Haga, model and actress
December 18
Miki Ando, figure skater
Ayaka, singer
Yuki Furukawa, actor
December 20
Yutaka Otsuka, baseball player
Michihiro Yasuda, football player

Deaths
January 21: Ikki Kajiwara, author, manga writer, and film producer (b. 1936)
February 3: Prince Takamatsu (b. 1905)
March 8: Iwao Yamawaki, photographer (b. 1898)
April 5: Tsuneko Nakazato, novelist (b. 1909)
April 15: Masatoshi Nakayama, master of Shotokan karate (b. 1913)
April 21: Haruyasu Nakajima, baseball player (b. 1909)
May 10: Sadamichi Hirasawa, tempera painter (b. 1892)
June 6: Mori Mari, author (b. 1903)
June 16: Kōji Tsuruta, actor (b. 1924)
July 17: Yujiro Ishihara, actor (b. 1934)
July 20: Ichirō Arishima, comedian and actor (b. 1916)
August 5: Tatsuhiko Shibusawa, novelist, art critic, and translator of French literature (b. 1928)
August 7: Nobusuke Kishi, former prime minister (b. 1896)
August 10: Prince Yamashina Takehiko (b. 1898)
August 16: Sumiko Kurishima, actress and master of traditional Japanese dance (b. 1902)
November 11: Hiroshi Kawaguchi, actor (b. 1936)
December 29: Jun Ishikawa, author (b. 1899)

Statistics
Yen value: US$1 = ¥122 (low) to ¥152 (high)

See also
 1987 in Japanese television
 List of Japanese films of 1987

References

 
Years of the 20th century in Japan
Japan